The Liberal Reform Party (LiRA) was a small free market classical liberal political party in the Czech Republic. It had one member of the Senate, Jiří Zlatuška, who was elected to his six-year term in 2002-2008.

See also
Liberalism in the Czech lands

External links
Liberal Reform Party official site (in Czech)

Classical liberal parties
Defunct political parties in the Czech Republic
Defunct liberal political parties
Liberal parties in the Czech Republic